The 2019–20 Kategoria e Parë was the 72nd official season of the Albanian football second-tier since its establishment. The season began on 14 September 2019 and ended on 29 July 2020. There were 20 teams competing this season, split in 2 groups, each with 10 teams. The 2 winners of each group gained promotion to the 2020-21 Kategoria Superiore, and played the division's final against each other. The runners-up of each group played a play-off match between them. The winners of the play-off played another promotion play-off match against the 8th ranked team of the 2019–20 Kategoria Superiore. Apolonia and Kastrioti were promoted to the 2020–21 Kategoria Superiore. Devolli, Iliria, Shënkolli, Shkumbini and Tërbuni were relegated to the 2020–21 Kategoria e Dytë. Apolonia won their fifth Kategoria e Parë title on 22 July 2020 after beating Kastrioti in the final match. The competition was completely suspended from 12 March to 7 June 2020, due to a pandemic of COVID-19 in Albania.

Changes from last season

Team changes

From Kategoria e Parë
Promoted to Kategoria Superiore:
 Bylis
 Vllaznia

Relegated to Kategoria e Dytë:
 Tomori
 Vora

To Kategoria e Parë
Relegated from Kategoria Superiore:
 Kastrioti

Promoted from Kategoria e Dytë:
 Devolli
 Shkumbini
 Tërbuni

Locations

Stadia by capacity and locations

Group A

Group B

First phase

Group A

Group B

Second phase

Promotion round

Group A

Group B

Relegation round

Group A

Group B

Final

Promotion play-off

Besëlidhja qualified to the final play-off match.

Relegation play-offs

Both teams remained in their respective leagues.

Partizani B were promoted to the Kategoria e Parë, while Devolli were relegated to the Kategoria e Dytë.

Season statistics

Scoring

Top scorers

References

2019-20
2
Albania